Seabrook may refer to:

Places

Australia
 Seabrook, Victoria
 Seabrook, Tasmania

United Kingdom
 Seabrook, Kent

United States
 Seabrook, Georgia
 Seabrook, Maryland
 Seabrook station (MARC)
 Seabrook, Massachusetts
 Seabrook, New Hampshire
 Seabrook Station Nuclear Power Plant
 Seabrook, New Jersey
 Seabrook Farms, New Jersey
 Seabrook, South Carolina, in Beaufort County
 Seabrook Island, South Carolina, in Charleston County
 Seabrook, Texas

Other
 Seabrook, a fictional location in the 2018 film Zombies
 MV Seabrook, an Empire F type coaster in service with Seaway Coasters Ltd, 1946–54
 Seabrook Bridge in New Orleans
 Seabrook Potato Crisps, a brand of crisps in the United Kingdom

People with the surname Seabrook
Seabrook (surname)